The 58th Assembly District of Wisconsin is one of 99 districts in the Wisconsin State Assembly.  Located in southeastern Wisconsin, the district covers central Washington County, including the city of West Bend and the villages of Slinger and Jackson, and the northern half of the village of Richfield.  It also contains the University of Wisconsin–Milwaukee at Washington County campus, the Moraine Park Technical College, and West Bend Municipal Airport, and a significant portion of the Pike Lake Unit, Kettle Moraine State Forest. The district is represented by Republican Rick Gundrum, elected to the seat in a January 2018 special election following the death of previous officeholder Bob Gannon.

The 58th Assembly district is located within Wisconsin's 20th Senate district, along with the 59th and 60th Assembly districts.

List of past representatives

References 

Wisconsin State Assembly districts
Washington County, Wisconsin